Terry Gibbs (born Julius Gubenko; October 13, 1924) is an American jazz vibraphonist and band leader.

He has performed or recorded with Tommy Dorsey, Chubby Jackson, Buddy Rich, Woody Herman, Benny Goodman, Alice Coltrane, Louie Bellson, Charlie Shavers, Mel Tormé, Buddy DeFranco, and others. Gibbs also worked in film and TV studios in Los Angeles.

Biography
On being discharged from the armed forces, where he played drums in military bands, Gibbs worked in New York with Bill De Arango and recorded with Tiny Kahn in Aaron Sachs’s quintet (1946).

In the 1950–1951 season, Gibbs was a popular guest on Star Time on the DuMont Television Network. Thereafter, he was a regular in 1953–1954 on NBC's Judge for Yourself.

In the late 1950s, he appeared on NBC's The Steve Allen Show, on which he regularly played lively vibraphone duets with the entertainer and composer. In 1997, he appeared on Steve Allen's 75th Birthday Celebration on PBS. Gibbs was also the bandleader on the short-lived That Regis Philbin Show. As an instrumentalist, together with his big band, the Dream Band, Gibbs has won prestigious polls, such as those of Downbeat and Metronome.

His son is jazz drummer Gerry Gibbs.

The Dream Band

When Gibbs moved from New York to California in 1958 he began planning for his next big band album. In early 1959 he booked extended residencies at two Los Angeles night clubs, the Seville and the Sundown, for what became known as the Dream Band.

The band usually played on a Sunday, Monday or Tuesday night when the cream of Hollywood jazz and studio musicians would be available. The core band always remained stable with Mel Lewis holding down the drum chair.

Some of the key players were lead altoist Joe Maini, tenor saxists Bill Holman and Med Flory, trumpeters Al Porcino and Conte Candoli and trombonists Frank Rosolino and Bob Enevoldsen.

New arrangements were commissioned from Bill Holman, Marty Paich, Med Flory, Manny Albam and Al Cohn, among others, to feature Gibbs’ vibes in front of the band. The band released four albums from 1959 to 1961.

 1959: Launching a New Band – some versions are titled Launching a New Sound in Music
 1960: Swing Is Here!
 1961: The Exciting Terry Gibbs Big Band!!!!!! – reissued as Dream Band, Vol. 4: Main Stem
 1961: Explosion! – reissued as Dream Band, Vol. 5: The Big Cat

Four additional albums of unissued live material recorded in 1959 have been released since 1986.
 Dream Band
 The Dream Band, Vol. 2: The Sundown Sessions
 Dream Band, Vol. 3: Flying Home
 Dream Band, Vol. 6: One More Time

The Music Stop
In the mid 1960s, Gibbs opened a musical instrument store in Canoga Park, California, with former Benny Goodman drummer Mel Zelnick. Terry Gibbs and Mel Zelnick Music Stop was also the first teaching facility of  Freddie Gruber and Henry Bellson, brother of Louie.

Discography

 Good Vibes (Savoy, 1951)
 Terry Gibbs Sextet (Savoy, 1954)
 Terry Gibbs (Emarcy, 1956)
 Mallets a-Plenty (Emarcy, 1956)
 Vibes on Velvet (Emarcy, 1956)
 Swing...Not Spring! (Savoy, 1956)
 Harry Babasin and the Jazz Pickers/Terry Gibbs (VSOP, 1957)
 Jazz Band Ball (VSOP, 1957)
 Swingin'  (Emarcy, 1957)
 Terry Gibbs Plays the Duke (Emarcy, 1957)
 More Vibes on Velvet (EmArcy, 1958) with the sax section from the Dream Band
 Launching a New Band, aka Launching a New Sound in Music (EmArcy, 1959)
 Dream Band (Contemporary, 1959)
 The Dream Band, Vol. 2: The Sundown Sessions (Contemporary, 1959)
 Dream Band, Vol. 3: Flying Home (Contemporary, 1959)
 Vibrations (Interlude, 1959)
 Dream Band, Vol. 6: One More Time (Contemporary, 1959)
 Swing Is Here (Verve, 1960)
 Music from Cole Porter's Can Can (Verve, 1960)
 Steve Allen Presents Terry Gibbs at the Piano (Signature, 1960)
 The Exciting Terry Gibbs Big Band (Verve, 1961) – reissued as Dream Band, Vol. 4: Main Stem (Contemporary)
 Explosion! (Mercury, 1961) – reissued as Dream Band, Vol. 5: The Big Cat (Contemporary)
 That Swing Thing! (Verve, 1962)
 Straight Ahead (Verve, 1962)
 Terry Gibbs Plays Jewish Melodies in Jazztime (Mercury, 1963)
 El Nutto (Limelight, 1963)
 Gibbs/Nistico (Time, 1963)
 Hootenanny My Way (Time, 1963)
 Take It from Me (Impulse!, 1964)
 Latino (Roost, 1964)
 It's Time We Met (Mainstream, 1965)
 Terry Gibbs Quartet (1965)
 Reza (Dot, 1966)
 Bopstacle Course (Xanadu, 1974)
 Sessions Live: Terry Gibbs, Pete Jolly, and Red Norvo  (Calliope, 1976)
 Live at the Lord (Jazz a la Carte 1978)
 Smoke 'em Up (Jazz a la Carte 1978)
 Jazz Party: First Time Together with Buddy DeFranco (Palo Alto 1981)
 Air Mail Special (Contemporary, 1981)
 Now's the Time with Buddy DeFranco (Tall Tree, 1984)
 The Latin Connection (Contemporary, 1986)
 Chicago Fire with Buddy DeFranco (Contemporary, 1987)
 Holiday for Swing with Buddy DeFranco (Contemporary, 1988)
 Memories of You: A Tribute to Benny Goodman with Buddy DeFranco, Herb Ellis (Contemporary, 1991)
 Kings of Swing with Buddy DeFranco (Contemporary, 1992)
 Play That Song: Live at the 1994 Floating Festival (Chiaroscuro, 1994)
 Wham (Chiaroscuro, 1999)
 Terry Gibbs and Buddy DeFranco Play Steve Allen (Contemporary, 1999)
 From Me to You: A Tribute to Lionel Hampton (Mack Avenue, 2003)
 52nd & Broadway: Songs of the Bebop Era (Mack Avenue, 2004)
 Feelin' Good: Live in Studio (Mack Avenue, 2005)
 Findin' the Groove (Jazzed Media, 2006)
 92 Years Young: Jammin at the Gibbs House (Whaling City Sound, 2017)

With Leonard Cohen
 Death of a Ladies' Man (Columbia, 1977)

With Dion DiMucci
 Born to Be with You (Phil Spector, 1975)

With Liza Minnelli
 Gently (Angel, 1996)

Bibliography

References

External links

1924 births
Living people
American jazz bandleaders
American jazz vibraphonists
Big band bandleaders
Jewish American musicians
Verve Records artists
Impulse! Records artists
Contemporary Records artists
Xanadu Records artists
Jewish jazz musicians
Mack Avenue Records artists
21st-century American Jews